Lists of research stations provide indexes to research stations in a particular region. They include:

 List of space stations
 Research stations in Antarctica
 List of research stations in the Arctic

Refer to :category:Research stations for a complete list of articles on research stations.